Roberto Gaggioli (born 10 September 1962 in Vinci) is an Italian former cyclist.

Professional from 1985 to 2005, Gaggioli spent most of his career in the United States. He won the Philadelphia International Championship in 1988, and the International Cycling Classic in 1990 and 1992. He rode in the 1986 Giro d'Italia, finishing in 127th position.

His father Luciano Gaggioli was a professional cyclist from 1960 to 1963. He married Lynn Brotzman, also a professional cyclist.

Major results

1986
 1st Coppa Bernocchi
1987
 1st Fitchburg Longsjo Classic
 1st Stage 8 Coors Classic
 2nd De Kustpijl
1988
 1st Philadelphia International Championship
 1st Stage 3 Giro del Trentino
 1st Overall Tour of Somerville
1990
 1st International Cycling Classic
1991
 1st Stage 2 Cascade Classic
1992
 1st International Cycling Classic
 1st Stages 3 & 12 Vuelta a Colombia
1993
 1st New Jersey National Bank Classic
 1st Stage 2 Fitchburg Longsjo Classic
 1st Stage 1 Settimana Ciclistica Lombarda
1994
 1st Stage 4 Redlands Bicycle Classic
1995
 1st Stages 1 & 10 Herald Sun Tour
 1st Stage 5 Tour de Toona
 1st Overall Valley of the Sun Stage Race
1st Stage 3
1996
 1st Stage 1a Herald Sun Tour
 2nd  Philadelphia International Championship
1998
 1st Stage 3 Tour de Langkawi
2001
 1st Stage 3 Tour of Croatia

References

1962 births
Living people
People from Vinci, Tuscany
Italian male cyclists
Sportspeople from the Metropolitan City of Florence
Cyclists from Tuscany